Tunisnews is  an archive of news events and documents related to Tunisia's political events.

Tunisnews gained a reputation during the years for been a free and independent news agency.  Reporting daily on events happening in Tunisia concerning Tunisians, North Africans Arabs and Muslims in general.

It is a collection of daily newsletters sent to subscribers and browsed online on the official website Tunisnews.net.
It includes information about the Tunisian opposition parties, organisations in Tunisia, list of events, documents, and daily discussions amongst the readers and some of the opposition activists. 
Tunisnews.net is blocked inside Tunisia

See also 
 Media of Tunisia

References

External links
 Official web site
 blog mirroring original site
 2007
 2005
 2006
 human rights watch

Tunisian news websites